The 2017–18 Liga Panameña de Fútbol season (also known as the Liga Cable Onda) was the 28th season of top-flight football in Panama. The season began on 17 July 2017 and was scheduled to end in May 2018. Ten teams competed throughout the entire season.

Teams
Atlético Nacional finished in 10th place in the overall table last season and were relegated to the Liga Nacional de Ascenso. Taking their place for this season are the overall champions of last season's Liga Nacional de Ascenso,
Independiente.

Managerial changes

Before the start of the season

During the Apertura season

Between Apertura and Clausura seasons

During the Clausura season

2017 Apertura

Personnel and sponsoring (2017 Apertura)

Standings

Results

Second stage

Semifinals
First legs

Second legs

Finals 
Grand Final

2018 Clausura

Personnel and sponsoring (2018 Clausura)

Standings

Results

Second stage

Semifinals
First legs

Second legs

Finals 
Grand Final

List of foreign players in the league
This is a list of foreign players for the 2017-2018. The following players:
have played at least one game for the respective club.
have not been capped for the Panama national football team on any level, independently from the birthplace

Alianza 
  Robyn Pertuz x
  Edwin Grueso x
  Mauricio Castaño x

Arabe Unido
  Miguel Lloyd x
  Johnatan Mosquera x

Atlético Veraguense 
  Carlos Gallego x
  Humberto Mendoza x
  Yonaider Ortega x
  Jonathan Villa x
  Jesus Lopez x

Chorillo
  Ariel Bonilla x
  Andres Escobar x
  David Loaiza x
  Julian Munoz x

Independiente
  David Uribe x
  Gerardo Negrete x
  Arichel Hernandez x
  Michel Salgado x
  Abel Marcovecchio x

Plaza Amador
  Lid Carabali x
  Jose Murillo x
  Daniel Blanco x

Santa Gema
  Juan Cano x
  Jhoan Romero x
  Milton Segura x

San Francisco FC
  Caio x 
  Damaso Pichon x
  Juan Esteban Ospina x
  Thomas Sierra x
  Cristian Zuniga x

Sporting San Miguelito
  Wilmer Largacha x
  Jorge Sandoval x

Tauro FC
  Gustavo Chara x
  Juan Tamburelli x

 (player released mid season)

Aggregate table

External links
 https://web.archive.org/web/20181006121704/http://panamafutbol.com/?cat=3&paged=3
 http://lpf.com.pa/w/category/noticas/
 https://int.soccerway.com/national/panama/lpf/20172018/apertura/r42284/
 http://www.rpctv.com/deportes/futbolnacional/

Liga Panameña de Fútbol seasons
Pan